The granular dogfish, Centroscyllium granulatum, is a little-known, very small dogfish shark of the family Etmopteridae, endemic to the Falkland Islands.

Physical characteristics
The granular dogfish has no anal fin, two dorsal spines with the second one much larger than the first, a large second dorsal fin, a long abdomen, small pectoral and pelvic fins, a large eye, prominent nostrils and spiracles, and brownish-black coloration. It is very small, growing to only 28 cm.

Distribution
They have only been found around the Falkland Islands in the South Atlantic.

Habits and habitat
Almost nothing is known about this shark. It has been caught at around 450 m depth.

References

Sources
 
 
 
 FAO Species Catalogue Volume 4 Parts 1 and 2 Sharks of the World

Centroscyllium
Fish described in 1887
Taxa named by Albert Günther